Groot River or Grootrivier may refer to:

 Groot River (Eastern Cape), a tributary of the Gamtoos River (South Africa)
 Groot River (Southern Cape), a tributary of the Gourits River (South Africa)
 Groot River (Western Cape), a tributary of the Riet River, part of the Olifants/Doring River System (South Africa)
 Groot River (Tsitsikamma), a small river in the Tsitsikamma Region close to the Nature's Valley resort (South Africa)
Grootrivier Pass, a mountain pass above the Groot River (Tsitsikamma) Valley (South Africa)
 Another name for the Orange River (South Africa)